Kayı is a village in Bor district of Niğde Province, Turkey. At  it is situated in the plains of Central Anatolia, to the south of Melendiz Mountain. The population of Kayı was 728 as of 2011.

References 

Villages in Bor District, Niğde